Mulherin is a surname. Notable people with the surname include:

 Michelle Mulherin (born 1972), Irish politician
 Tim Mulherin (1957–2020), Australian politician
 Wayne Mulherin (born 1957), Australian cricketer